Keiferia chloroneura is a moth in the family Gelechiidae. It was described by Edward Meyrick in 1923. It is found in Amazonas, Brazil.

References

Keiferia
Moths described in 1923
Taxa named by Edward Meyrick